Greatest Hits is a compilation album by British pop band Thompson Twins, released in 1996 on the Arista Records label.

It is the group's first compilation of singles, the remix collection Greatest Mixes having already been released in 1988, mainly promoted by the remix "In the Name of Love '88."

Greatest Hits includes all of Thompson Twins' singles from 1982 to 1987, omitting earlier minor tracks from their UK debut album, A Product of ... (Participation), and the later single "Sugar Daddy," the last mainstream hit they had in the U.S., taken from their unsuccessful 1989 album Big Trash. Though Thompson Twins' previous album, 1987's Close to the Bone, was also a flop, both singles taken from it–"Get That Love" and "Long Goodbye"–are included here. 

Thompson Twins' first singles collection chronologically compiles songs by the band's three different lineups (big band in the early years, three-piece group from 1983 to 1987, and duo in the later years).

Thompson Twins released one more unsuccessful album after the span of time covered on this compilation. 1991's Queer generated two more singles: "Come Inside" and "The Saint." Though these were minor hits—and quite popular in clubs—neither would be included on the band's next greatest hits collection either: the double disc Love on Your Side – The Best of Thompson Twins, issued in 2007.

Track listing
 "In the Name of Love" from Set
 "Lies" from Quick Step and Side Kick
 "We Are Detective" from Quick Step and Side Kick
 "If You Were Here" from Quick Step and Side Kick
 "Love on Your Side" from Quick Step and Side Kick
 "Hold Me Now" from Into the Gap
 "Doctor! Doctor!" from Into the Gap
 "You Take Me Up" from Into the Gap
 "The Gap" from Into the Gap
 "Sister of Mercy" from Into the Gap
 "Don't Mess with Doctor Dream" from Here's to Future Days
 "Lay Your Hands on Me" from Here's to Future Days
 "King for a Day" from Here's to Future Days
 "Nothing In Common" from Nothing in Common
 "Get That Love" from Close to the Bone
 "Long Goodbye" from Close to the Bone

Credits

Tom Bailey: lead vocals, keyboards, electric and upright bass, guitar
Alannah Currie: percussion, drums, background vocals
Joe Leeway: congas, synthesizer, backing vocals

1996 greatest hits albums
Thompson Twins albums
Arista Records compilation albums